Michee Efete (born 11 March 1997) is a Congolese professional footballer who plays as a defender for EFL League Two side Grimsby Town.

Efete began his career with Norwich City and played for the clubs U23's in the EFL Trophy. He most notably spent a spell playing in the Icelandic Premier Division for Breiðablik before returning to England and playing in Non-League for Torquay United, Maidstone United, Bath City, Billericay Town and Wealdstone.

He has been capped at U20 level by Congo.

Career

Norwich City
Born in London, England to Congolese parents, Efete joined Crystal Palace as a youngster before joining Norwich City in 2012 as part of their youth academy. He played 25 games for the Under-23s in his sides Premier League 2 campaigns during the 2016–17 and 2017–18 seasons.

On 30 August 2016 he made his debut for Norwich in a 6–1 win over Peterborough United in the EFL Trophy alongside the likes of James Maddison, Todd Cantwell, Josh Murphy and Harry Toffolo. He would also play in The Canaries 5–0 victory over Barnet and 4–1 win over Milton Keynes Dons in the same competition.

In the summer of 2017 he was loaned out to Icelandic Premier Division side Breiðablik where he would play 8 games, scoring in a 3–2 win over Víkingur Reykjavík. Upon his return he signed for Torquay United on loan for the 2017–18 season.

Non-League
Efete was released by Norwich in the summer of 2018 and would sign permanently with National League side Maidstone United. In October 2018 he joined Bath City on loan, later moving to Billericay Town on loan in January 2019.

Wealdstone
In June 2019, Efete signed for Wealdstone. He scored his first goal for the club on 7 September 2019, in a 1-0 win against Oxford City, and netted a total of 7 times as Wealdstone won the National League South title, earning the club promotion to the fifth tier of English football.

Efete signed a new two year contract with the club in September 2020. On 17 October 2020, Efete scored his first goal at National League level, in Wealdstone's 4-3 victory over Wrexham, and would go on to make 22 appearances in 2020-21, although he missed much of the second half of the season due to being placed on furlough. He departed the club at the end of the season

Grimsby Town
On 22 June 2021, Efete signed a one-year deal with Grimsby Town, his first professional contract since his Norwich days.

Grimsby secured promotion with victory in the play-off final, though Efete was not in the matchday squad at London Stadium.

On 20 June 2022, Grimsby announced Efete has signed a new two-year contract of their 2022–23 EFL League Two campaign.

Career statistics

Honours
Wealdstone
National League South: 2019–20

Grimsby Town
National League play-off winners: 2022

References

Living people
1997 births
Citizens of the Democratic Republic of the Congo through descent
Democratic Republic of the Congo footballers
English sportspeople of Democratic Republic of the Congo descent
Association football defenders
Norwich City F.C. players
Breiðablik UBK players
Torquay United F.C. players
Maidstone United F.C. players
Bath City F.C. players
Billericay Town F.C. players
Wealdstone F.C. players
Grimsby Town F.C. players